Groupe F is a production company specialised in the design and performance of live shows and pyrotechnic events. It operates on five continents.

History 
Founded in 1990 in Bessèges (Gard, F) by François Montel, Alain Burkhalter and Didier Mandin, Groupe F takes off internationally in 1992 with the arrival of Éric Noel, Nicolas Mousques, Caroline and Christophe Berthonneau, designing the pyrotechnic effects of the Barcelona Summer Olympics closing ceremony. In 1993, Groupe F goes on a world tour with its show "Oiseaux de Feu" (Birds of Fire), followed by "Un peu plus de Lumière" and also performs the closing fireworks of the 1998 FIFA World Cup.

On 31 December 1999, Groupe F stages the pyrotechnic show on the Eiffel Tower celebrating the transition to the year 2000. Building on the worldwide success of the event, the group recruits a multidisciplinary team for the artistic and technical implementation of its major projects. Jonas Bidaut, Cédric Moreau, Eric Travers and Jeff Yelnik have supported the international development of Groupe F ever since.

In 2000, Groupe F starts exploring new scenographic territories and creates tools for monumental shows, combining light, video mapping, music, fire and human performers. The Palace of Versailles, the Pont du Gard and the Eiffel Tower host these new creations on several occasions.

In November 2017, the Ministry of Culture entrust the company with the opening show of the Louvre Abu Dhabi.

Main live shows 
 Les Oiseaux de Feu (on tour from 1994 to 2000)
 Un peu plus de Lumière (on tour from 1997 to 2010) 
 Joueurs de Lumière (on tour from 2004 to 2010)
 Coups de Foudre (on tour from 2008 to 2010)
 Versailles : La Face cachée du Soleil (2007 and 2008)
 L'Autre Monde, Les États et Empires du Soleil (2009)
 Les Noces Royales de Louis XIV (2010)
 Le Roi de Feu (2015, 2016, 2017)
 "Migrations" series (since 2012)
 Rhône, in Arles, for the launch of Marseille Provence, European Capital of Culture 2013
 Focus – La Saga des Photons, for the launch of Dunkirk Regional Capital of Culture 2013
 À Fleur de Peau (on tour since 2014)
 At the Pont du Gard : Lux Populi (2008), Impressions (2011), Ludolux (2012), Ulysse au pays des merveilles (2013), Le Magicien d'eau (2014), Les Mondes Magiques (2015), Feux Gaulois (2016), Feux Romains (2017)
 Suspended time, original creation for the 50th anniversary of the Beatles album Sgt. Pepper's Lonely Hearts Club Band at the Sgt Pepper at 50 festival in Liverpool, 2017
 Vives réflexions, inauguration show of Louvre Abu Dhabi, 2017

Main pyrotechnics events 
 Closing of the Barcelona Summer Olympics, 1992
 Closing of the 1998 FIFA World Cup
 Transition to the year 2000 on the Eiffel Tower
 Opening and closing of the 2004 Athens Summer Olympics and Paralympics
 Inauguration of the Patras bridge, 2004
 Closing of the Universal Forum of Cultures in Barcelona, 2004
 New Year in London on the London Eye, 2004 to 2009
 2007: Inauguration of the new TGV Est line
 Opening and closing of the 2006 Winter Olympics and Paralympics in Turin
 Inauguration of the Museum of Islamic Art, Doha, 2008
 Opening of the Jeff Koons exhibition at the Palace of Versailles, 2008 
 Johnny Hallyday's Tour 66
 Inauguration of the Burj Khalifa 2010
 Opening and closing of the 2011 AFC Asian Cup in Doha
 New Year on Taipei 101, Taiwan, 2012–2015
 Pyrotechnic design for Cai Guo-Qiang's "One Night Stand" at the 2013 Paris Nuit Blanche
 Fireworks on the Eiffel Tower on Bastille Day 2004, 2009, 2014, 2015, 2016, 2018, 2020
 Opening and closing ceremonies of the 2016 Summer Olympics and Paralympics in Rio
 Inauguration of the Lotte World Tower in Seoul, South Korea, 2017

Visual identity

See also

Bibliography 
 Le Théâtre du feu, Élise Thiébaut (text), Thierry Nava (photos), Actes Sud, 2002 
 Feux royaux à Versailles, Raphael Masson and Elise Thiébaut (text), Thierry Nava (photos), Actes Sud, 2008

External links 
 (fr+en) Groupe F official website 
  Groupe F LLC (Middle East) official website

Entertainment companies established in 1990
Pyrotechnics
Entertainment companies of France
Companies based in Occitania (administrative region)
French companies established in 1990